was the son of Asakura Ujikage and proclaimed 9th head of Asakura during the early Sengoku Period of Feudal Japan.

Samurai
Daimyo
1473 births
1512 deaths